1984–85 Hong Kong FA Cup was the 11th staging of the Hong Kong FA Cup. It was competed by all of the 9 teams from Hong Kong First Division League.

South China won the cup for the first time after beating Harps in the final by 3–1 in the reply match.

Fixtures and results

Bracket

References

Hong Kong FA Cup
Hong Kong Fa Cup
Fa Cup